The New England Association was an Independent level minor league baseball league that played in the 1877 season and briefly in the 1895 season. The league franchises were based in Rhode Island, Massachusetts and New Hampshire. The New England Association was an eight–team league in 1877 and a six–team league in 1895 and permanently folded after the partial 1895 season. The 1877 league was one of the earliest minor leagues.

Baseball Hall of Fame members Candy Cummings managed Lynn in the 1877 New England Association and Ned Hanlon played for the 1877 Fall River Casscades.

History
Formed for the 1877 season, the New England Association began play on May 3, 1877, as an eight–team league, but ended the season reduced to four teams. The league was one of the earliest minor leagues. On August 27, 1877, Providence turned a triple play in a game against Lowell. The Lowell Ladies Men, with a 33–7 record, won the championship, finishing 4.0 games ahead of the second place Manchester Reds who finished with a 29–11 record. Lowell and Manchester were followed in the final standings by the Fall River Cascades (19–21) and Providence Rhode Islanders (11–29). Both Lowell and Fall River had also been members of the 1877 League Alliance agreement, and in one game on June 12, 1877, future Hall of Famer Pud Galvin pitched the International Association member Pittsburgh Alleghenies to a 3–2 win over Lowell. The Lynn Live Oaks (8–22), Fitchburg, Haverhill and Lawrence franchises all folded before the 1877 New England Association season ended on October 15, 1877. The New England Association folded after the 1877 season.

In November 1877, the Lowell Ladies Men defeated the major leagues' National League champion Boston Red Caps 9–4 in an exhibition contest.

The New England Association had two Baseball Hall of Fame members in the 1877 league. Hall of Fame inductee Candy Cummings managed the 1877 Lynn Live Oaks, while fellow Baseball Hall of Fame member Ned Hanlon played for the 1877 Fall River Casscades at age 19.

In 1895, the New England Association reformed as a six–team independent league under the direction of president J.C. Morse. The six franchises were Fitchburg, Haverhill, Lawrence Indians, Lowell, Nashua Rainmakers and Salem. On May 3, 1895, in a game at Nashua, Lawrence defeated Nashua 36–17. The Fitchburg and Haverhill franchises both disbanded on June 20, 1895. Salem moved to Haverhill on June 20, 1895. On May 21, 1895, William Regan of Salem threw the New England Association's only no-hitter against Fitchburg in a 6–0 victory. The New England Association permanently disbanded mid–season on July 8, 1895. At season's end, the Lawrence Indians won the New England Association championship with a 33–19 record, followed by the Nashua Rainmakers (27–21), Lowell (24–24) and Salem/Haverhill (20–28).

New England Association franchises

League standings

1877 New England Association

1895 New England Association

Notable alumni
Candy Cummings (1877) Baseball Hall of Fame, Inducted 1939
Ned Hanlon (1877) Baseball Hall of Fame, Inducted, 1980

References

Defunct minor baseball leagues in the United States
Baseball leagues in Rhode Island
Baseball leagues in Massachusetts
Baseball leagues in New Hampshire
Defunct professional sports leagues in the United States
Sports leagues established in 1877
Sports leagues disestablished in 1895
1877 establishments in the United States